Indian wedding clothes are elaborate set of clothes worn by the bride, bridegroom, and other relatives attending the wedding.

Clothing culture
Attire is extremely important in an Indian wedding, not only for the marrying couple, but also the guests attending, the family, and the relatives. The bride is usually dressed up in auspicious colors, whereas the bridegroom is dressed to exude a regal aura. The bridesmaids and groomsmen are often dressed on par with the bride and the groom, but not as elaborately as the bride and groom. Many of the guests attending the wedding wear gold jewelry including the bride and sometimes the groom. The women are additionally adorned with henna patterns on their palms, hand, forearms, legs, and feet. Sometimes henna patterns are replaced with alta designs which are short lived and easily removable.

In some cultures, the groom also sports henna, although it is often less elaborate or muted. Indian weddings generally tend to continue for several days and new attire is worn each day. All these dresses and the colour symbolize the meaning of marriage and the period that follows it. An Indian wedding is one that gives more importance to details like different rituals and the various attires one wears to attend them.

Hindu weddings
Indian Hindu weddings continue for several days. India is a country that defines diversity and this is visible even in the wedding and its different styles. The ceremonies, the rituals, the formalities are all different between each region and culture. Unlike the Christians, Hindus wedding ceremony does not resemble the western marriages and are quite elaborate. In the North, Starting from the Tilak ceremony, each function has significance in the marriage. Tilak, Sangeet, Haldi, Baraat and the Shaadi, all necessitate the Bride and the bridegroom to wear new attire at each occasion. All these above ceremonies are known by different names in the other parts, e.g. Simant puja in the west, or Mangalasnanam in the south and so on.

Bridegroom's clothes

Many communities of South, West, and Eastern India adhere to their traditional costumes, i.e. Dhoti and Mundu by some communities of the South. Kurta or a shirt may be worn or sometimes just an angavastram may be used to cover the chest.

On the other hand, in the Northern parts, the bridegroom usually wears a sherwani, Jodhpuri suit, or a Western suit. The groom’s face is veiled with a curtain of flowers which is called sehra in the North, which is not the custom elsewhere. It is also customary to wear a Taqiyah all through the ceremony in Muslim marriages.

The ensemble for bridegrooms include sherwani, blended Indo-western suit and ethnic Jodhpuri suit. The shirts, coats, and jackets are designed with extra care and touch to bring out the magnanimity out of the bridegroom on the marriage day. Precious embellishments are studded into the collars and the cuffs of the bridegroom’s dress. Available both in simple cotton and splendid, royal raw silk, these kurta are preferred mostly by the bridegrooms.

Bride's clothes
The bride wears a wedding sari or lehenga according to the region. In Indian culture, the wedding dress of bride comes from groom's side as a shagun. Red is considered to be the most auspicious color among Hindus. While the sari is preferred as the bridal dress in South India, West, East India, traditional wear such as the mekhela sador is preferred in North-east India and brides of the North of India prefer Lehenga, Gagra Choli and Odni as bridal dresses.

Christian weddings
Christian marriage in India is mostly an adaptation of Western wedding ceremonies. Here the bridegroom wears a western suit or tuxedo. The bride usually opts for a red silk sari or a Western gown, or wears the gown for the church ceremony and changes into the sari for some or all of the reception.

Bridesmaid and family

The typical Indian Hindu marriage ceremony does not usually have the concept of bridesmaids. But in many Hindu weddings, women in the family often prefer to wear either a sari, lahenga, Anarkali Salwar Suit or simple shalwar kameez. Contemporary and Indo-western wear has also started gaining popularity among Indian women as wedding wear.

See also
 Choli
 Churidar
 Dupatta
 Ghagra
 Ghoonghat
 Indian dress
 Indo-Western clothing
 Khara Dupatta
 Lehenga Style Saree
 Sarong
 Sherwani
 Wedding sari

Wedding Saree
Dresses
Indian wedding clothing